Huub van Boeckel (born 25 January 1960) is a retired professional tennis player from the Netherlands, who was one of the Netherlands' leading players in the 1980s. 

A right-hander, van Boeckel reached his highest singles ranking on the ATP Tour on 21 October 1985, when he became world No. 93.

Career finals

Singles (1 runner-up)

Doubles (1 runner-up)

External links
 
 
 

1960 births
Living people
Dutch male tennis players
Sportspeople from The Hague
20th-century Dutch people